Andrea Renzi may refer to:

 Andrea Renzi (actor)
 Andrea Renzi (basketball)